Hamilton County is located in the southwestern corner of the U.S. state of Ohio. As of the 2020 census, the population was 830,639, making it the third-most populous county in Ohio. The county seat and largest city is Cincinnati. The county is named for the first Secretary of the Treasury, Alexander Hamilton.
Hamilton County is part of the Cincinnati-Middletown, OH-KY-IN Metropolitan Statistical Area.

History
The southern portion of Hamilton County was originally owned and surveyed by John Cleves Symmes, and the region was a part of the Symmes Purchase. The first settlers rafted down the Ohio River in 1788 following the American Revolutionary War. They established the towns of Losantiville (later Cincinnati), North Bend, and Columbia.

Hamilton County was organized in 1790 by order of Arthur St. Clair, governor of the Northwest Territory, as the second county in the Northwest Territory. Cincinnati was named as the seat. Residents named the county in honor of Alexander Hamilton, who was the first Secretary of the Treasury of the United States and a founder of the Federalist Party. Its original boundaries were those defined for the Symmes purchase contract in 1788: the Ohio River in the South, Great Miami River to the west, the Lesser Miami River to the east, and the Cuyahoga River to the North. Its area then included about one-eighth of Ohio, and had about 2,000 inhabitants (not including the remaining Native Americans). 

The county was greatly expanded in 1792 to include what is today the lower peninsula of Michigan. Since 1796, other counties were created from Hamilton, reducing the county to its present size. The county was the location of much of the Northwest Indian War both before and after its organization.

The United States forcibly removed most of the Shawnee and other Indian peoples to move to locations west of the Mississippi River in the 1820s. 

Rapid growth occurred during the 1830s and 1840s as the area attracted many German and Irish immigrants, especially after the Great Famine in Ireland and the revolutions in Germany in 1848.

During the Civil War, Morgan's Raid (a Confederate cavalry campaign from Kentucky) passed through the northern part of the county during the summer of 1863.

The Sharonville Engineer Depot was constructed by the United States Army in northern Hamilton County in 1942, and continued to be used by the General Services Administration and then the Defense Logistics Agency after 1949. It is currently mostly redeveloped for industrial purposes.

Geography

Adjacent counties
 Franklin County, Indiana  (northwest)
 Dearborn County, Indiana  (west)
 Butler County  (north)
 Warren County  (northeast)
 Clermont County  (east)
 Campbell County, Kentucky  (southeast)
 Kenton County, Kentucky  (south)
 Boone County, Kentucky  (southwest)

Geographic features

The county lies in a region of gentle hills formed by the slopes of the Ohio River valley and its tributaries. The Great Miami River, the Little Miami River, and the Mill Creek also contribute to this system of hillsides and valleys. No naturally occurring lakes exist, but three
major manmade lakes are part of the Great Parks of Hamilton County. The largest lake by far is Winton Woods Lake, covering 188 surface acres, followed by Miami Whitewater Lake, covering 85 surface acres, and Sharon Lake, covering 36 surface acres.

The county boundaries include the lowest point in Ohio, in Miami Township, where the Ohio River flows out of Ohio and into Indiana.

Major highways

Demographics

2000 census
As of the 2000 census, there were 845,303 people, 346,790 households, and 212,582 families living in the county. The racial makeup of the county was 69.2% White, 26.0% Black or African American, 0.1% Native American, 2.3% Asian, 0.01% Pacific Islander, 0.51% from other races, and 2.2% from two or more races. 2.8% of the population were Hispanic or Latino of any race.

There were 346,790 households, out of which 30.20% had children under the age of 18 living with them, 43.40% were married couples living together, 14.30% had a female householder with no husband present, and 38.70% were non-families. 32.90% of all households were made up of individuals, and 10.60% had someone living alone who was 65 years of age or older. The average household size was 2.38 and the average family size was 3.07.

In the county, the population was spread out, with 25.80% under the age of 18, 9.60% from 18 to 24, 29.70% from 25 to 44, 21.50% from 45 to 64, and 13.50% who were 65 years of age or older. The median age was 36 years. For every 100 females there were 91.10 males. For every 100 females age 18 and over, there were 86.80 males.

The median income for a household in the county was $40,964, and the median income for a family was $53,449. Males had a median income of $39,842 versus $28,550 for females. The per capita income for the county was $24,053. About 8.80% of families and 11.80% of the population were below the poverty line, including 16.20% of those under age 18 and 8.70% of those age 65 or over.

2010 census
As of the 2010 census, there were 802,374 people, 333,945 households, and 197,571 families living in the county. The racial makeup of the county was 68.8% white, 25.7% black or African American, 2.0% Asian, 0.2% American Indian, 0.1% Pacific islander, 1.1% from other races, and 2.1% from two or more races. Those of Hispanic or Latino origin made up 2.6% of the population. In terms of ancestry, 31.0% were German, 14.7% were Irish, 7.7% were English, and 6.6% were American.

Of the 333,945 households, 29.7% had children under the age of 18 living with them, 39.4% were married couples living together, 15.4% had a female householder with no husband present, 40.8% were non-families, and 33.9% of all households were made up of individuals. The average household size was 2.34 and the average family size was 3.04. The median age was 37.1 years.

The median income for a household in the county was $48,234 and the median income for a family was $64,683. Males had a median income of $48,344 versus $37,310 for females. The per capita income for the county was $28,799. About 11.1% of families and 15.4% of the population were below the poverty line, including 22.9% of those under age 18 and 9.0% of those age 65 or over.

Population
The county's highest population was recorded in the 1970 U.S. Census. Since then, the county has lost population at an average rate of three percent per decade. Although Hamilton County is experiencing a decline in birth rates and has higher death rates in older age groups (cohorts), out-migration of residents is the key factor in population loss. In the last decade, this population loss has been reversed, and it is estimated that both Hamilton County and the City of Cincinnati have grown their populations.
The Cincinnati Metropolitan Statistical Area, over the last three decades has seen a 19 percent increase in population. Much of the region's growth has been through movement of Cincinnati and Hamilton County residents into neighboring counties.

Government

As of 2020, the members of the Hamilton Board of County Commissioners are Denise Driehaus, Stephanie Summerow Dumas, and Alicia Reece.

Since 1963, the Board has employed an administrator to run the day-to-day operations of the county; the current administrator is Jeffrey Aluotto. Other elected officers include Dusty Rhodes (Auditor), Joe Deters (Prosecutor), Charmaine McGuffey (Sheriff), Eric Beck (Engineer), Scott Crowley (Recorder), Jill Schiller (Treasurer), and Lakshmi Sammarco (Coroner).

As of 2021, the elected Common Pleas Court include: Judge Jody Luebbers, Judge Lisa Allen, Judge Jennifer Branch, Judge Wende Cross, Judge Leslie Ghiz, Judge Robert Goering, Judge Tom Heekin, Judge Christian Jenkins, Judge Charles Kubicki, Judge Melba Marsh, Judge Terry Nestor, Judge Robert Ruehlman, Judge Nicole Sanders, Judge Megan Shanahan, Judge Alan Triggs, and Judge Christopher Wagner.

Politics
Hamilton County was historically rather conservative for an urban county. It long favored Republican candidates in national elections, but has trended Democratic in recent years. In 2008, Barack Obama was the first Democratic presidential candidate to win the county since 1964, and only the second since 1936. The county continued to lean Democratic, voting for Obama again in 2012 and for Democratic candidate Hillary Clinton in 2016. In fact, it was one of the few counties in Ohio to swing toward the Democrats in 2016 even as the state as a whole swung toward the Republicans.

In other state elections, the county also tended to favor Republican candidates. Richard Cordray in his failed 2018 bid was the first Democrat to win the county in a gubernatorial election since Dick Celeste in 1982, and only the second since Michael DiSalle in 1958. In Senate elections, the county also tended to back Republicans, but has been won by Frank Lausche in 1962, John Glenn in all four of his elections and both Howard Metzenbaum and Sherrod Brown in two out of three elections for both (1982 and 1988, and 2012 and 2018). In 2006, both Ted Strickland and Sherrod Brown lost the county by less than 2,000 votes while winning statewide by 24 and 12 points, respectively.

With the election of Democrat Stephanie Summerow Dumas in 2018 midterm elections, the Hamilton County Board of Commissioners was entirely Democratic for the first time ever. Democrats had previously regained majority control of the Board of Commissioners in 2016 with the election of Denise Driehaus. In 2019, longtime Democratic Commissioner Todd Portune announced his resignation from the Board due to health problems. Portune's Chief of Staff, Victoria Parks, was appointed to serve the remainder of his term (through the November 2020 general election). With Parks' appointment, the Board of Commissioners became for the first time all-female and majority Black. In the November 2020 election, Democrat Alicia Reece was elected to fill Parks' seat, thereby retaining the Board's status as all-female and majority Black.

Historically, due to its tight races and its position in the swing state of Ohio, Hamilton County was regarded as a crucial county to win in presidential elections. In 2012, The Washington Post named Hamilton as one of the seven most important counties in the country for that year's election. Time characterized Hamilton County's political scene as "a battle between conservative suburbs and a Democratic urban center, though Cincinnati is one of the most conservative metro areas in the Midwest." Those characterizations became less true in recent years. While many of Cincinnati's western suburbs, like Green and Delhi Townships, continue to strongly support Republican candidates, the city itself and most of its northern suburbs vote strongly Democratic.

|}

Hamilton County Officials

Ohio House of Representatives

Ohio State Senate

United States House of Representatives

United States Senate

Education

K-12 education

Public elementary and secondary education is provided by 23 school districts:

 Cincinnati Public Schools
 Deer Park Community City
 Finneytown Local
 Forest Hills Local
 Indian Hill Exempted Village
 Lockland Local
 Loveland City
 Madeira City
 Mariemont City
 Milford Exempted Village
 Mount Healthy City
 North College Hill City
 Northwest Local
 Norwood City
 Oak Hills Local
 Princeton City
 Reading City
 Southwest Local
 St. Bernard - Elmwood Place City
 Sycamore Community
 Three Rivers Local
 Winton Woods City
 Wyoming City

In 2016, Cincinnati Public Schools had 35,000 students, 63% of which were African-American. The county also has a vocational school district, the Great Oaks Institute of Technology and Career Development. Parochial schools of various denominations add to this base. Among these the Roman Catholic Archdiocese of Cincinnati maintains a system of 108 elementary and 22 secondary schools, the ninth largest private school system in the United States.

Colleges and universities

Transportation

Major highways
Interstate 71, Interstate 74, Interstate 75, Interstate 471 and Interstate 275 serve the county. The Norwood Lateral and Ronald Reagan Cross County Highway are also prominent east–west thoroughfares in the county.

Railroads
CSX Transportation, Norfolk Southern, RailAmerica, and Amtrak.

Recreation
The county, in cooperation with the City of Cincinnati, operates the Public Library of Cincinnati and Hamilton County system with a main library and 41 branches. Major sports teams are listed under the communities in which they are located, primarily Cincinnati. The Great Parks of Hamilton County district resides within Hamilton County and maintains a series of preserves and educational facilities. Three of the largest parks within the system are Miami Whitewater Forest, Winton Woods, and Sharon Woods. The Hamilton County Fair is the oldest county fair in Ohio.

Communities

Cities

 Blue Ash
 Cheviot
 Cincinnati (county seat)
 Deer Park
 Fairfield (small part)
 Forest Park
 Harrison
 Village of Indian Hill
 Loveland (part)
 Madeira
 Milford (part)
 Montgomery
 Mount Healthy
 North College Hill
 Norwood
 Reading
 Sharonville (mostly)
 Springdale
 Wyoming

Villages

 Addyston
 Amberley
 Arlington Heights
 Cleves
 Elmwood Place
 Evendale
 Fairfax
 Glendale
 Golf Manor
 Greenhills
 Lincoln Heights
 Lockland
 Mariemont
 Newtown
 North Bend
 Silverton
 St. Bernard
 Terrace Park
 Woodlawn

Townships
The following list includes townships that have existed within present-day Hamilton County, including those that no longer exist or remain only as paper townships. It does not include townships that became part of Butler, Warren, Clermont, Montgomery, and other counties.

 Anderson
 Cincinnati (defunct)
 Colerain
 Columbia
 Crosby
 Delhi
 Green
 Harrison
 Miami
 Mill Creek (defunct)
 Springfield
 Spencer (defunct)
 Storrs (defunct)
 Sycamore
 Symmes
 Whitewater

Census-designated places

 Blue Jay
 Brecon
 Bridgetown
 Camp Dennison
 Cherry Grove
 Coldstream
 Concorde Hills
 Covedale
 Delhi Hills
 Delshire
 Dent
 Dillonvale
 Dry Ridge
 Dry Run
 Dunlap
 Elizabethtown
 Finneytown
 Forestville
 Fruit Hill
 Grandview
 Groesbeck
 Highpoint
 Hooven
 Kenwood
 Loveland Park (part)
 Mack
 Madison Place
 Miami Heights
 Miamitown
 Monfort Heights
 Mount Healthy Heights
 New Baltimore
 New Burlington
 New Haven
 Northbrook
 Northgate
 Plainville
 Pleasant Hills
 Pleasant Run
 Pleasant Run Farms
 Remington
 Ridgewood
 Rossmoyne
 Salem Heights
 Shawnee
 Sherwood
 Sixteen Mile Stand
 Skyline Acres
 Taylor Creek
 Turpin Hills
 White Oak

Unincorporated communities
 Colerain Heights
 Mount Saint Joseph

Neighborhoods of Cincinnati

 Avondale
 Bond Hill
 California
 Camp Washington
 Carthage
 Clifton
 College Hill
 Columbia-Tusculum
 Corryville
 CUF
 Downtown
 East End
 East Price Hill
 East Walnut Hills
 East Westwood
 English Woods
 Evanston
 Hartwell
 The Heights
 Hyde Park
 Kennedy Heights
 Linwood
 Lower Price Hill
 Madisonville
 Millvale
 Mount Adams
 Mount Airy
 Mount Auburn
 Mount Lookout
 Mount Washington
 North Avondale
 North Fairmount
 Northside
 O'Bryonville
 Oakley
 Over-the-Rhine
 Paddock Hills
 Pendleton
 Pleasant Ridge
 Queensgate
 Riverside
 Roselawn
 Sayler Park
 Sedamsville
 South Cumminsville
 South Fairmount
 Spring Grove Village
 Walnut Hills
 West End
 West Price Hill
 Westwood
 Winton Hills

See also
 National Register of Historic Places listings in Hamilton County, Ohio

References

External links

 County website
 Hamilton County Park District
 Hamilton County Board of Mental Retardation & Developmental Disabilities
 Hamilton County, Ohio History and Genealogy
 Flag of Hamilton County: crwflags.com and ihiochannel.org

 
Ohio counties on the Ohio River
1790 establishments in the Northwest Territory
Populated places established in 1790